Little Brown Jug Wall of Fame honors those persons who have made a contribution to the success of the Little Brown Jug harness race. It is located at the Delaware County, Ohio fairgrounds at 236 Pennsylvania Avenue, Delaware, Ohio. Through the auspices of the Delaware County Fair, the new member is presented with a Wall of Fame jacket and a wall plaque at the time of the race.

Through 2016 there have been 32 individuals elected to the Wall of Fame chosen by a panel of national and international harness racing enthusiasts.

Little Brown Jug Wall of Fame members
1985 - Henry C. "Hank" Thomson
1986 - William R. "Billy" Haughton
1987 - Delvin G. "Del" Miller 
1988 - John F. Simpson, Sr. 
1989 - Stanley F. Dancer
1990 - John G. Hayes, Sr.  
1991 - Stanley F. Bergstein 
1992 - Gene Riegle
1993 - James A. Rhodes
1994 - Corwin M. Nixon
1995 - W. D. "Tom" Thomson
1996 - John Campbell
1997 - Charlie Bowen
1998 - George Segal
1999 - H. Charles Armstrong
2000 - Roger Huston
2001 - Michel Lachance 
2002 - Thomas Walsh, Jr.
2003 - William O'Donnell
2004 - Howard Beissinger
2005 - Mrs. LaVerne A. Hill
2006 - Ron Waples
2007 - Jules Siegel
2008 - Dr. J. Glen Brown
2009 - Joe M. Thomson
2010 - Phil Terry
2011 - Paul E. Spears 
2012 - Jeff Gural
2013 - James W. "Jim" Simpson
2014 - Dr. Don "Doc" Mossbarger
2015 - Jim Buchy
2016 - William C. "Bill" Lowe
2017 - David Miller
2018 - Ron Pierce
2019 - Jimmy Takter
2021 - Mickey & Sylvia Burke

References

American horse racing awards
Harness racing in the United States
Sports in Delaware County, Ohio